Betalevel (formerly c-level) is a venue located in a basement down an alley in Chinatown, Los Angeles, behind a Chinese restaurant, underneath the shops and art galleries of Chung King Road.

Betalevel hosts media events such as screenings, performances, classes, lectures, debates, dances, readings and tournaments. The LA Times describes it as having the furtive, secretive feel of a speakeasy.

References

External links 
 Betalevel.com - Official site of Betalevel
 LA Weekly - Best Sunken Lair for Techno Geeks
 The alternatives are out there - LA Times
 LA Times - Making art a team sport

Culture of Los Angeles